The 1989–90 NBA season was the Timberwolves' 1st season in the National Basketball Association. Nearly 30 years since the Lakers left for Los Angeles, the NBA returned to Minneapolis with an expansion team known as the "Minnesota Timberwolves". The Timberwolves, along with the Orlando Magic, joined the NBA in 1989. The team revealed a new primary logo of a blue wolf with green eyes in front of a silver basketball, and added new uniforms with the color scheme of blue, green and silver. 

In the 1989 NBA Expansion Draft, the Timberwolves selected veteran players like Rick Mahorn, Tyrone Corbin, Steve Johnson, Brad Lohaus and Scott Roth, and signed free agents Tony Campbell, Tod Murphy, Sidney Lowe, and undrafted rookie forward Sam Mitchell. However, Mahorn never played for the T-Wolves, as he was traded to the Philadelphia 76ers. The Timberwolves received the tenth overall pick in the 1989 NBA draft, and selected point guard Pooh Richardson out of UCLA. The team also hired Bill Musselman as their first head coach.

The T-Wolves made their debut on November 3, 1989, losing to the Seattle SuperSonics, 106–94 on the road. Five days later, they made their home debut at the Hubert H. Humphrey Metrodome, losing to the Chicago Bulls, 96–84. Just two nights later, the T-Wolves would finally get their first win, beating the 76ers at home in overtime, 125–118 on November 10. In January, the team traded Lohaus to the Milwaukee Bucks in exchange for Randy Breuer. However, the Timberwolves struggled in their first season, posting two nine-game losing streaks, finishing sixth place in the Midwest Division with a 22–60 record. 

Campbell led the team in scoring averaging 23.2 points, contributing 5.5 rebounds and 1.4 steals per game, and finishing in third place in Most Improved Player voting, while Corbin averaged 14.7 points, 7.4 rebounds and 2.1 steals per game, and Mitchell provided the team with 12.7 points and 5.8 rebounds. In addition, Richardson contributed 11.4 points, 6.8 assists and 1.6 steals per game, and was selected the NBA All-Rookie First Team, while Murphy provided with 8.3 points and 6.9 rebounds per game, and Lowe contributed 2.3 points and 4.2 assists per game, only shooting just .319 in field-goal percentage.

The team's primary logo and uniforms both remained in use until 1996.

Draft picks

Roster

NBA Expansion Draft

Prior to the 1989 NBA draft, the NBA held a coin toss between the Timberwolves and the other new expansion team, the Orlando Magic, to determine their order for the NBA Draft and the expansion draft. The Magic won the coin toss and chose to have the first pick in the expansion draft and pick 11th in the NBA Draft, while the Timberwolves picked second in the expansion draft and 10th in the NBA Draft.

The previous season's expansion teams, the Charlotte Hornets and Miami Heat, were not involved in this year's expansion draft and did not lose any player.

Regular season

Standings

Record vs. opponents

Game log

Player statistics

|-
| *
| 82 || 81 || 38.6 ||style="background:#000000;color:#01A951;"| .457 ||style="background:#000000;color:#01A951;"| .167 || .787 || 5.5 || 2.6 || 1.4 || 0.4 ||style="background:#000000;color:#01A951;"| 23.2
|-
| 
| 82 ||style="background:#000000;color:#01A951;"| 80 || 36.7 || .481 || .000 || .770 || 7.4 || 2.6 || 2.1 || 0.5 || 14.7
|-
| *
| 80 || 30 || 30.2 || .446 || .000 || .768 || 5.8 || 1.1 ||style="background:#000000;color:#01A951;"| 0.8 || 0.7 || 12.7
|-
| 
| 82 || 48 || 31.5 || 461 || .277 || .589 || 2.6 || 6.8 || 1.6 || 0.3 || 11.4
|-
| 
| 51 || 47 || 26.0 || .416 || .000 || .662 || 5.7 || 1.6 || 0.6 || 1.5 || 10.2
|-
| 
| 82 || 59 || 30.4 || 471 || .372 || .709 || 6.9 || 1.3 || 0.9 || 0.7 || 8.3
|-
| 
| 28 || 24 || 21.1 || .465 || .063 || .808 || 3.9 || 2.2 || 0.5 || 0.8 || 7.5
|-
| 
|style="background:#000000;color:#01A951;"| 71 || 3 || 14.9 || .397 || .356 || .696 || 3.0 || 1.9 || .7 || .7 || 9.0
|-
| *
| 66 || 0 || 11.3 || .379 || 346 || .746 || 1.6 || 1.6 || 0.7 || 0.1 || 6.8
|-
| 
| 73 ||style="background:#000000;color:#01A951;"| 73 || 11.3 || .470 || .417 || .850 || 2.1 || 0.7 || 0.5 || 0.1 || 5.9
|-
| 
| 14 || 0 || 8.1 || .469 || .000 || .557 || 5.2 || 1.5 || .8 ||style="background:#000000;color:#01A951;"| 2.0 || 8.8
|-
| 
| 52 || 0 || 7.3 || .517 || .000 || .763 || 3.0 || .4 || .3 || .5 || 5.5
|-
| *
| 80 || 38 || 21.8 || .498 || .000 || .703 || 5.2 || 1.1 || .8 || .7 || 11.7
|-
| 
| 22 || 0 || 5.8 || .468 || .440 ||style="background:#000000;color:#01A951;"| .883 || 2.8 ||style="background:#000000;color:#01A951;"| 5.4 || 1.2 || .1 || 11.8
|-
| 
| 4 || 0 || 4.3 || .402 || .359 || .733 || 1.5 || 3.0 || .7 || .1 || 7.2
|}

* – Stats with the Timberwolves.

Awards and honors
 Pooh Richardson, NBA All-Rookie Team

Transactions

References 

Minnesota Timberwolves seasons
Timber
Timber
Monnesota